In the mathematical field of differential geometry, a Codazzi tensor (named after Delfino Codazzi) is a symmetric 2-tensor whose covariant derivative is also symmetric. Such tensors arise naturally in the study of Riemannian manifolds with harmonic curvature or harmonic Weyl tensor. In fact, existence of Codazzi tensors impose strict conditions on the curvature tensor of the manifold. Also, the second fundamental form of an immersed hypersurface in a space form (relative to a local choice of normal field) is a Codazzi tensor.

Definition
We say that the tensor  is a Codazzi tensor if 

for all

Examples
 Any parallel -tensor field is, trivially, Codazzi.
If there is a global choice of unit normal vector field, then relative to this choice, the second fundamental form is a Codazzi tensor on  This is an immediate consequence of the Gauss-Codazzi equations.
 Let  be a space form with constant curvature  Given any function  on  the tensor  is Codazzi. This is a consequence of the commutation formula for covariant differentiation.
 Let  be a two-dimensional Riemannian manifold, and let  be the Gaussian curvature. Then  is a Codazzi tensor. This is a consequence of the commutation formula for covariant differentiation.
 Let Rm denote the Riemann curvature tensor. Then  (" has harmonic curvature tensor") if and only if the Ricci tensor is a Codazzi tensor. This is an immediate consequence of the contracted Bianchi identity.
 Let  denote the Weyl curvature tensor. Then  (" has harmonic Weyl tensor") if and only if the "Schouten tensor"

 is a Codazzi tensor. This is an immediate consequence of the definition of the Weyl tensor and the contracted Bianchi identity.

Rigidity of Codazzi tensors
Matsushima and Tanno showed that, on a Kähler manifold, any Codazzi tensor which is hermitian is parallel. Berger showed that, on a compact manifold of nonnegative sectional curvature, any Codazzi tensor  with  constant must be parallel. Furthermore, on a compact manifold of nonnegative sectional curvature, if the sectional curvature is strictly positive at least one point, then every symmetric parallel 2-tensor is a constant multiple of the metric.

See also
Weyl–Schouten theorem

References
 Arthur Besse, Einstein Manifolds, Springer (1987).

Tensors